The Millionaire ( or ) is a 1947 German comedy film directed by Robert A. Stemmle and starring Hans Moser, Annie Rosar and Hans Holt. It was made by the Munich-based Bavaria Film at the company's Bavaria Studios in the city. The film's sets were designed by the art director Hans Sohnle. The film was shot during the final stages of the Second World War, but wasn't released until 1947.

Synopsis
Leopold Habernal, lives a quiet, modest life as a postman. When he unexpectedly inherits a large sum of money he suddenly becomes an object of desire for several unmarried woman in the town, leading also to resentment amongst his former male friends. Ultimately he is able to use his money to benefit everyone.

Cast
 Hans Moser as Leopold Habernal, Postbote
 Annie Rosar as Frau Meierhofer, seine Wirtin
 Hans Holt as Franz Lichtenegger, Komponist
 Alfred Neugebauer as Kanzleirat Lichtenegger, sein Onkel
 Franz Pfaudler as Krüger, Schuster
 Gabriele Reismüller as Marianne, seine Tochter
 Karl Skraup as Robert Füringer, Friseur
 Lotte Lang as Anni Schober, Inhaberin eines Korsettgeschäfts
 Oskar Sima as Draxler, Fuhrwerksbesitzer
 Theodor Loos as Schreyegg, Rechtsanwalt und Notar
 Adolf Gondrell as Postvorstand
 Änne Bruck as Seine Frau
 Ernst Fritz Fürbringer as Rienösl, Advokat
 Bruno Hübner as Steindl, Reisender
 Lisa Helwig as Frau Steindl
 Ellen Hille as Frau Staberger, Metzgermeisterin

References

Bibliography 
 Jill Nelmes & Jule Selbo. Women Screenwriters: An International Guide. Palgrave Macmillan, 2015.

External links 
 

West German films
1947 films
German comedy films
1947 comedy films
1940s German-language films
Films directed by Robert A. Stemmle
German black-and-white films
Bavaria Film films
1940s German films
Films shot at Bavaria Studios